The 2013 Fuji GT 300km was the sixth round of the 2013 Super GT season. It took place on September 8, 2013 at the Fuji Speedway in Oyama, Shizuoka, Japan.

Background
NISMO drivers Ronnie Quintarelli and Masataka Yanagida led the GT500 championship standings by one point over Impul's João Paulo de Oliveira and Tsugio Matsuda, while Team Mugen led the GT300 championship over R&D Sport's Subaru BRZ.

A total of 40 cars were entered for the race, all 38 cars that raced at Suzuka were in the Fuji race with their normal 2-driver lineups, while the Tomei Sports Nissan GT-R GT3 returned to the series after missing Suzuka, as did the Dijon Racing Callaway Corvette Z06.R GT3.

Report

Practice
The #1 MOLA Nissan GT-R was the fastest car in the GT500 class, while the #6 Team LeMans Lexus SC430 was 2nd fastest. In GT300 the #30 apr Nissan GT-R GT3 was fastest from two other Nissan GT-R's, the #3 NDDP Racing in 2nd and the #5 Team Mach in 3rd. The #50 Arnage Aston Martin V12 Vantage GT3 had suspension trouble during the session and only managed 23rd fastest.

Qualifying
Qualifying was held on September 7, 2013. Daiki Sasaki was the fastest driver in the first session for the GT300 cars from Yuhki Nakayama and Katsumasa Chiyo. The team ranked 4th in points, the #52 with Takeshi Tsuchiya driving only managed 16th fastest in the session. In the first session for GT500 cars Kohei Hirate was fastest from Yuhi Sekiguchi and Yuji Kunimoto. Neither the NISMO team or the Impul teams, ranked 1st and 2nd in the championship made the second session for the top 8 cars, Yanagida put in a laptime good enough for only 9th place, Oliveira was 14th fastest for Impul.

In the second GT300 qualifying session Shinichi Takagi was fastest with a 1:38.773, giving the #55 ARTA Honda CR-Z its second pole position of the season and the third for the Honda CR-Z. Kazuki Hoshino was 2nd fastest in the #3 NDDP Racing Nissan GT-R GT3, 0.425 seconds slower than Takagi's laptime. Hideki Mutoh qualified the championship leading car in 3rd place despite carrying 114 kg of weight ballast from the team's results during the season. The team that won the 500km race earlier in the season, the #31 apr Toyota Prius was 9th fastest. In the second session for GT500 cars the #38 Team ZENT Cerumo Lexus SC430 with Yuji Tachikawa driving was again fastest in Q2 and gave Tachikawa his 18th pole position in Super GT, and his 8th at Fuji Speedway. Tachikawa's lap of a 1:32.548 was 0.272 seconds faster than Andrea Caldarelli in 2nd. Kazuki Nakajima was 6th fastest in the team that won the 500 km race earlier in the year.

Race
The race was held on September 8, 2013, starting at 2:00pm local time. Kohei Hirate led the field from pole position in GT500 while in GT300 Daiki Sasaki passed Shinichi Takagi for the race lead, the polesitting car having to change its engine before the race. Takagi would drop to fourth place but contact with Björn Wirdheim caused bodywork on the CR-Z to rub on the rear wheels, forcing the team to make a pitstop. On lap 19 Ryo Michigami driving the #32 Nakajima Racing Honda HSV-010 GT had a left-rear tyre puncture while travelling down the main straight, spun and crashed into the guardrail. With debris scattered over the circuit the safety car was brought out on lap 21. During the safety car all the GT500 teams with the exception of the #24 Kondo Racing Nissan GT-R decided to make their pitstops.

The #1 MOLA GT-R managed to get Yuhi Sekiguchi into the lead in the pitstops, from the #17 HSV-010 with Koudai Tsukakoshi driving and Daisuke Ito in the #37 SC430 in 4th, however Sekiguchi was deemed to have been in violation of the restart procedure and were later given a drive-through penalty. The #4 GSR Hatsune Miku BMW started 5th in GT300 but were able to take the lead of the cars that had made their pitstop under the safety car. The #100 Team Kunimitsu HSV-010 retired following the restart due to radiator damage, while the #19 Bandoh SC430 retired from steering rod damage due to contact with a GT300 car. Juichi Wakisaka in the #39 SARD SC430 was given a drive-through penalty for a collision with Kazuki Nakajima in the #36 TOM'S SC430. On lap 43 Yuji Tachikawa managed to get the #38 back into the race lead after passing Tsukakoshi and the lead #24 GT-R with Hironobu Yasuda, who was slowing to make his pitstop. Tachikawa would hold off Tsukakoshi in the slippery conditions for the remaining 22 laps and win his 15th GT500 race. Nobuteru Taniguchi in the #4 BMW was unchallenged following the safety car, once the cars ahead pitted he was in the lead, and won by a margin of over 47 seconds over the #31 apr Toyota Prius.

Results

Qualifying

Race
Race result is as follows.

GT500 Fastest Lap – Kohei Hirate, #38 Lexus Team Zent Cerumo Lexus SC430 – 1:34.633
GT300 Fastest Lap – Nobuteru Taniguchi, #4 GSR Hatsune Miku BMW Z4 GT3 – 1:41.666

Point rankings after the event

GT500 Driver Point rankings

GT300 Driver Point rankings

 Note: Only the top five positions are included for both GT500 and GT300 classes.

References

External links
Super GT official website 

Fuji GT 300km